Les Lacs-du-Témiscamingue (French meaning "The Lakes of Temiscaming") is a large unorganized territory in the Abitibi-Témiscamingue region of Quebec, Canada.

Until October 31, 2005, Les Lacs-du-Témiscamingue and Laniel unorganized territories were part of the Rivière-Kipawa unorganized territory.

Demographics
Population:
 Population in 2021: 10
 Population in 2016: 15
 Population in 2011: 0
 Population in 2006: 5
 Population in 2001: 0 (adjusted for boundary change)

Private dwellings occupied by usual residents: 6

Total private dwellings: 15

See also
 List of unorganized territories in Quebec

References

Unorganized territories in Abitibi-Témiscamingue
Témiscamingue Regional County Municipality